Tideswell is a village and civil parish in the Peak District of Derbyshire, England. The population (including Wheston) was 1,820 in 2001, increasing slightly to 1,827 at the 2011 Census, making it the second-largest settlement within the National Park, after Bakewell. Tideswell Dale is a short limestone valley leading south from the village to the River Wye valley.

Name
There is some debate as to how the village got its name. The English Place Name Society accepts it as being named after a Saxon chieftain named Tidi, others that the name comes from a "tiding well" situated in the north of the village. This 'ebbing and flowing' well was declared to be one of the Seven Wonders of the Peak by Thomas Hobbes in his 1636 book De Mirabilibus Pecci.

Tideswell is known locally as Tidza or Tidsa.  In addition, local residents are known as Sawyeds, owing to a traditional story about a farmer who freed his prize cow from a gate in which it had become entangled, by sawing its head off. Today the story is re-enacted raucously and colourfully every Wakes week by a local mummers group called the Tidza Guisers.

History and heritage

In the Middle Ages, Tideswell was a market town known for lead mining. The Tideswell lead miners were renowned for their strength and were much prized by the military authorities. The Domesday Book of 1086 lists TIDESUUELLE as the King's land in the charge of William Peverel with fewer than five households.

Tideswell is now best known for its 14th-century parish church, the Church of St John the Baptist, known as the "Cathedral of the Peak", which contains three 15th-century misericords.  A sundial  lies in the churchyard; it is positioned on steps which local historian Neville T. Sharpe thinks likely to be those of the village's market cross.  A market and two-day fair were granted to the village in 1251. The Foljambe family, later the Foljambe baronets, were the principal landowners from the fourteenth to the eighteenth centuries.

The town has a week-long festival near the summer solstice known as the Wakes, culminating in "Big Saturday", which includes a torchlight procession through the streets, led by a brass band playing a unique tune called the Tideswell Processional, and townsfolk dancing a traditional weaving dance.

Taste Tideswell
In May 2009, Tideswell won a £400,000 grant from the Big Lottery Fund's Village SOS programme.  In a bid to help keep its village shops open and thriving—over 20 shops had closed in the preceding decade—Taste Tideswell was created, to reconnect local people with their food and make Tideswell famous as a food destination. On 6 December 2010 the Tideswell School of Food opened, running full-priced cookery and brewing courses as well as subsidised community courses.  The School of Food was intended to be the financial engine for the project that would help to develop work in the community. It closed during 2014 because of cashflow issues.

Tideswell Made is a quality mark that local food producers, retailers, public houses and holiday accommodation can buy into. Ensuring products are sourced as locally as possible and made locally, Tideswell Made is marketed by Taste Tideswell and helps local business get wider recognition for their locally made produce. Taste Tideswell has an education service, visiting schools with a variety of food- and growing-related activities. School groups also visit the School of Food for practical hands-on activities.

Behind the Parish Church, a small community garden has been developed to provide a training ground for those wanting to learn more about growing. There is also a small commercial kitchen available for hire by local food producers, particularly those who are looking to make the step up from home-based production.  In May 2011, the first Tideswell Food Festival was held, attracting over 2,000 people, despite poor weather.

On 7 September 2011, the Taste Tideswell story was broadcast as part of the Village SOS series on BBC One. It showed the rapid development of the project, along with the individual story of Tim Nicol, the 'Village Champion' who moved to live in Tideswell for a year and helped the volunteer directors get Taste Tideswell established.  As of August 2011, Taste Tideswell employed eight members of staff, most of whom lived in the village, and had ten visiting chef/tutors on its books. Although the School of Food had to close, Tideswell's annual Food Festival has continued to be a success each year.

Facilities and activities
Tideswell Sports Complex was built in 2001 following a £1.2 million Sports Lottery grant and substantial fund-raising in the village.  There are two football pitches, a floodlit multi-use area with two tennis courts and five-a-side pitches marked out, a cricket ground, crown-green bowling area, a skate-park and two pavilions.  The town has a football team, Tideswell United, and they play in the Hope Valley League 'A' Division. They also run a reserve side competing in the Hope Valley League B Division as Tideswell United Blue Star. The ground has floodlights for midweek games, one of few sides at such a low level to use them.  The bowling club competes in local leagues, the cricket and tennis clubs compete in local friendly matches.

The village has a long theatrical tradition, Tideswell Theatre having been formed over 200 years ago to perform leading plays of the time. It was revived in 2002 to bring professional-quality theatre, music, dance and comedy to the area. Tideswell Community Players are one of the oldest drama groups in the country, formed in 1929. Until the 1960s the village also had its own cinema, The Picturehouse. Tideswell Cinema was revived in 2005 to bring film once more to the community, with screenings for three seasons at Bishop Pursglove School's hall, before relocating in 2008 to the upper storey of The George Hotel. A number of musical ensembles are also active in the village – notably Tideswell Male Voice Choir and The Tideswell Singers.

Notable people
Sir Godfrey de Foljambe (1317–76), Lord Chief Justice of Ireland
Blessed Christopher Buxton, Catholic martyr, studied at Tideswell Grammar school under Nicholas Garlick
Ric Lee, drummer of the blues/rock band Ten Years After, resides in Tideswell and participated in the male voice choir
Rev. J. M. J. Fletcher (Vicar of Tideswell), historian
Blessed Nicholas Garlick, Catholic priest and  martyr, was a schoolmaster here in the 16th century
Judy Leden, stunt flyer and three times world hang-gliding champion
William Newton, poet and philanthropist, was buried here
Samuel Slack, notable bass singer born 1757 of local fame, reputedly sang before King George III
A monument in the south transept of Tideswell parish church is doubtfully identified as that of Sir Thurstan de Bower
Edwina Currie, current President of the Tideswell Male Voice Choir
Robert Pursglove, sixteenth-century bishop, buried in Tideswell church

References

External links

Tideswell and District Community Association
The Village Voice – the village newsletter
Visit Tideswell – accommodation for visitors and holiday makers
Derbyshire UK – Tideswell
Peak District Online – Tideswell
Link to interesting search of Google Books on Tideswell with several good books fully online mentioning Tideswell.
The Feudal History of the County of Derby Vol.5 Section 9, by John Pym Yeatman. G4TIFF page images, plus poorly OCRed HTML. This has a lot of information on Tideswell during the 11th to 13th centuries.

Villages in Derbyshire
Towns and villages of the Peak District
Derbyshire Dales